JDP may refer to:

Architecture
 The Jacqueline Du Pré Music Building, St Hilda's College, Oxford, England
 Yugoslav Drama Theatre or Jugoslovensko Dramsko Pozorište (JDP), a theatre in Belgrade, Serbia

Politics
 Japan Democratic Party (1954), a right-wing political party in Japan 1954–1955
 Jharkhand Disom Party, a political party in India
 Justice and Development Party (Turkey), a political party in Turkey

Other
 Juicy Drop Pop, a brand of lollipops
 Jun dimerization protein, a member of the AP-1 family of transcription factors
 J.D. Power, a global marketing information services firm